Muddy Track is a documentary film by Neil Young (under the alias Bernard Shakey), made during his 1987 European tour with Crazy Horse. The film have long remained unreleased, although bootleg copies had been available through fan trading, and some of the footage made its way to Jim Jarmusch’s 1997 rockumentary Year of the Horse. In 2015 Muddy Track was premiered in cinemas as a part of "Shakey Films Retrospective". Since 2018 it has also been sporadically available for streaming for paid subscribers on Young's Archives website. It was given an official DVD release in 2021.

Information
Shot largely with a handheld camera (dubbed 'Otto' by Young), Muddy Track documents a difficult tour of Europe, plagued by poor weather, dwindling ticket sales, backstage arguments and audience riots. 
In an interview with MOJO in 1995 Young claimed that Muddy Track was among the favourite of all his films: "It’s dark as hell. God, it’s a heavy one! [...] But it’s funky".

NYA Production
DVD Production
Directed by: Bernard Shakey
Produced by: Will Mitchell
Executive Producer: Elliot Rabinowitz
Post Production for Shakey Pictures at Upstream Multimedia
Art Direction: Toshi Onuki
Production Assistance: Mark Faulkner
DVD Authoring and Encoding: Rich Winter at Blackbird Digital Studios, Marin County, CA

External links 
 
 Muddy Track on Neil Young Archives

Neil Young
Rockumentaries
1987 documentary films
Films directed by Neil Young
1980s English-language films